Frederiksbjerg School is a folkeskole in the Frederiksbjerg neighborhood of Aarhus. The school has 965 students.

The building was designed by Henning Larsen Architects and was opened in August 2016.

References

External links 

 School Homepage

Schools in Denmark
Aarhus